"The Joy Ride" is the fourth episode of the fifth and final series of the period drama Upstairs, Downstairs. It first aired on 28 September 1975 on ITV.

Background
"The Joy Ride" was recorded in the studio on 20 and 21 February 1975. Originally, Elizabeth Jane Howard had written a script called The Price of Rubies, which would have shown James Bellamy gambling and getting involved with an unsuitable woman. However, for an unknown reason, this was quickly dropped and in the space of one long weekend Alfred Shaughnessy produced "The Joy Ride". A later episode, An Old Flame, was written by John Hawkesworth and its storyline was similar to The Price of Rubies.

Cast
David Langton - Richard Bellamy
Simon Williams - James Bellamy
Hannah Gordon - Virginia Bellamy
Jean Marsh - Rose
Gordon Jackson - Hudson 
Joan Benham - Lady Prudence Fairfax
Gareth Hunt - Frederick
Karen Dotrice - Lily
Jenny Tomasin - Ruby

Plot
It is Autumn 1921, and following the death of his aunt Kate, Lady Castleton, James uses some of the money he has been given in her will to buy himself an Avro 504 aeroplane for £375. He has been taking flying lessons at Brooklands. On a clear, sunny day, James invites Virginia to go to Brooklands with him and he will take her flying. However, Richard wants her sit in the Strangers Gallery in the House of Lords while he delivers an important speech, and then to go to tea with him and some friends afterwards. However, Virginia decides to go with James, and Richard is visibly annoyed with this decision, and with his son's use of money.

At very short notice, Lady Prudence instead accompanies Richard to the Lords'. When they return to 165, Eaton Place at 6.15pm, James and Virginia are still not home. Not long after, Richard rings Brooklands, who then tell him that the two are missing. By 8.00pm that evening the news has reached the front page of The Evening News. The article suggests that there is something going on between James and Virginia. Lady Prudence insists on staying with Richard, and both sleep in the Morning Room. In the morning, Richard is told by telephone that the two are safe and well. Their plane landed on mudflats at Poole Harbour last night having gone the wrong way, and had to spend the night in the plane. In the morning, they had walked to Bournemouth and reported the accident. The same day they return to London by train, and Richard and Virginia make up.

Footnotes

References
Richard Marson, "Inside UpDown - The Story of Upstairs, Downstairs", Kaleidoscope Publishing, 2005
Updown.org.uk - Upstairs, Downstairs Fansite

Upstairs, Downstairs (series 5) episodes
1975 British television episodes
Fiction set in 1921

fr:La balade des souvenirs